Eritettix abortivus, known generally as the Texas short-winged slant-face grasshopper or Texas short-wing slantfaced grasshopper, is a species of slant-faced grasshopper in the family Acrididae. It is found in Central America and North America.

References

Further reading

 

Gomphocerinae
Articles created by Qbugbot
Insects described in 1890